The Arts Square (Ploshchad Iskusstv) is an open public square in the center of Saint Petersburg, Russia.

History
Before the construction of the Square, the land was the hunting grounds of the Empress Anna of Russia. Then Russian architect Francesco Bartolomeo Rastrelli (1700–1771) created a garden maze on the site. In the early 19th century, the Russian architect Carlo Rossi (1775–1849) was commissioned to develop the land between the Field of Mars and the Nevsky Prospect. The Mikhailovsky Palace, which now houses the main building of the Russian Museum, stood out as its most prominent building. Rossi also designed the Square, and the facades of the buildings facing Italianskaya Ulitsa and Mikhailovskaya Ulitsa.

His work was completed by other architects with the Mikhailovsky Theatre, the Jaquot House, the Saint Petersburg Philharmonia, and the Mikhailovsky Square Garden at its center.

From 1834 to 1918, the square was known as the Mikhailovskaya Square, and as the Lassalle Square from 1923 to 1952.

In 1902, when the Mikhailovsky Palace was turned into the Russian Museum, the eastern wing became the Russian Museum of Ethnography, a new address on Arts Square.

In August 1939, Isaak Brodsky died in his apartment on Arts Square, which then became a national museum.

Buildings
Central to the Square is the Mikhailovsky Square Garden with a statue of Alexander Pushkin. Around the square are the following buildings:

 Saint Petersburg Philharmonia
 Mikhailovsky Theatre
 Russian Museum (world's largest museum of Russian art)
 Russian Museum of Ethnography
 Jaquot House
 Kutuzov House
 Vielgorsky House
 Lazarev House
 Church of St. Catherine (its residential building)
 The Grand Hotel Europe

Events
Every year, the Saint Petersburg Philharmonia organizes the Arts Square International Festival in Saint-Petersburg. The event is free.

See also
 List of squares in Saint Petersburg

References

Carlo Rossi buildings and structures
Parks and open spaces in Saint Petersburg
Tourist attractions in Saint Petersburg
Squares in Saint Petersburg
Cultural heritage monuments of federal significance in Saint Petersburg